δ-Valerolactone is a lactone used as a chemical intermediate in processes such as the production of polyesters.

See also
 γ-Valerolactone

References

Delta-lactones